San Andrés  (formerly known as Campana San Andrés) is a pre-Columbian site in El Salvador, whose occupation began around the year 900 BC as an agricultural town in the valley of Zapotitán in the department of La Libertad. This early establishment was vacated by the year 250 because of the enormous eruption of the caldera of Lago Ilopango, and was occupied again in the 5th Century, along with many other sites in the valley of Zapotitán. Between 600 and 900 AD, San Andrés was the capital of a Maya polity with supremacy over the other establishments of Valle de Zapotitán.

The residential area has not yet been well studied. The investigations and excavations in San Andrés have been primarily of the political-ceremonial center and have revealed that it was divided into the South Seat (from which they governed) and the North Seat. In the year 600, the South Seat was filled with adobe (leaving a tunnel leading to the original seat) to construct the Acropolis, which contains ceremonial and political structures.  In the ends to the South and East of the Acropolis are pyramids or structures: 1 (the main pyramid), 2, 3 and 4. In the North ends and the west are a series of rooms where the governors lived (the last palaces of San Andrés) of which two have been reconstructed.  To the south of the Acropolis lies structure 7, another ceremonial structure. In the North seat, or Great Seat, is the pyramid or structure 5 (called "La Campana" - the bell) which is united with the Acropolis behind structure 6 (which has the shape of an L).  Around structure 5 are the structures where commerce took place.

Archaeology demonstrates that San Andrés had strong contacts with Copán and the Guatemalan Highlands, and received goods from such distant places as the present territories of Petén and Belize. San Andrés collapsed as a political center towards end of the 9th century. The last evidence of pre-Hispanic activity in the site was between the years 900 and 1200 as a residential site that consists of a final layer with fragments of censers and ceramics painted with scenes of sacrifice in Mixteca-Puebla style, which belong to a new cultural phase, named Guazapa, related to the pre-Hispanic city of Cihuatán.

After the Spanish Conquest, the ruins of San Andrés lay within a colonial estate dedicated to cattle and indigo production. The site was buried due to the eruption of the Playón volcano in 1658 AD, preserving the Colonial indigo production almost intact. In 1996, the Government of El Salvador inaugurated the Archaeological Park of San Andrés, where the visitor can climb the pyramids, see the indigo production area, and visit the site museum.

See also
History of El Salvador
List of Mesoamerican pyramids

References

Further reading

Maya sites in El Salvador
Former populated places in El Salvador
Tourist attractions in El Salvador
Pyramids in El Salvador
La Libertad Department (El Salvador)